The Battle of Lintulaks was fought between Swedish and Russian forces at Lintulaks in Finland on 3 July 1808 during the Finnish War.

Background
After having captured a Russian transport and 100 men at Perho, on 8 June, the Swedish Major Otto von Fieandt was sent to Lintulaks, west of Kuopio, with about 600 men to observe the two-way intersection leading to Kokkola respectively Vaasa, to protect the vital Swedish supply lines; Johan August Sandels had been forced to abandon the town shortly after the Battle of Kuopio, before Barclay de Tolly's army in Savonia.

Swedish forces 
Tavastehus Infantry Regiment (2 companies)
Savolax Infantry Regiment (2 companies)
Savolax Jäger Regiment (2 companies)
Nyland Dragoon Regiment ("a handful of men")
Finnish Artillery Regiment (2 light guns)

In total: 600 men and 2 light guns

Battle
On 3 July Fieandt was attacked by 1,400 men under Jegor Vlastov (sent by de Tolly); he received the attack in a fully stretched-out battle line, with no reserve, while Vlastov left one battalion and all his cavalry as reserve. At 2:00 PM it started raining and as the battle slowly started to die out, Fieandt commenced an all out bayonet attack. The first Russian lines withdrew before the Swedish onslaught but were soon caught by the reserve, which threw the Swedes back and forced them to retreat towards Perho. A Swedish detachment managed to halt the Russians by some stream, which saved them from a total disaster. The Swedes had lost 141 men in the fighting, of which 24 killed, while the Russians had lost 143, including 19 captured.

Aftermath
As the Swedish field-marshal, Wilhelm Mauritz Klingspor, received news of the defeat, he immediately dispatched two battalions from the Åbo and Nyland Infantry Regiments to Fieandt, along with 2 guns and 20 dragoons — increasing his force to 1,200 men — to stop the Russians from going north, towards Kokkola, which would cut off the Swedish lines of operation. Fieandt took a renewed position behind kokonsaari mosse, 4 km northwest of Perho Church. The Russians had likewise received reinforcements and counted at least 3,100 men under Generalmajor Jankovitj; he advanced on the Swedes and the two sides met once again at the Battle of Kokonsaari, on 11 July.

Notes, citations and sources

Notes

Citations

Sources

Lintulaks 1808
Lintulaks
1808 in Finland
Lintulaks
Lintulaks
May 1808 events